Oku-Kōmyō-En Sanatorium (光明園), or National Sanatorium Oku-Kōmyō-En is a sanatorium for leprosy and ex-leprosy patients on the island of Nagashima, Oku-machi, Setouchi, Okayama, Japan. The same island holds the National Sanatorium Nagashima Aiseien. As of December 2, 2005, the Oku-Kōmyō-En housed 252 residents (131 males and 121 females).

History
Sotojima Hoyoen Sanatorium opened April 1, 1909 in Nakashima, Nishiyodogawa-ku, Osaka for patients in Kyoto fu, Hyogo prefecture, Nara Prefecture, Wakayama prefecture, Mie prefecture, Shiga prefecture, Gifu Prefecture, Fukui Prefecture, Ishikawa Prefecture, Toyama Prefecture, and Tottori Prefecture.

The sanatorium, built in the Kanzaki River delta valley, was hit by the Muroto typhoon on September 21, 1934. The storm left 2,702 dead and 334 missing, including 187 people in the sanatorium (173 patients, 3 employees, and 11 family members). On September 24, 1934, the Interior Ministry decided to transfer 416 survivors to other sanatoriums, including Nagashima Aiseien Sanatorium (78 patients), Kyushu Sanatorium (Kikuchi Keifuen Sanatorium) (50 patients), Ooshima Sanatorium (70 patients), Zensho Byoin (Tama Zenshoen Sanatorium) (70 patients), Hokubu Hoyoen Sanatorium (50 patients), and Kuryu Rakusen-en Sanatorium (98 patients).

Timeline
April 1938: Prefectural Oku-Kōmyō-En Sanatorium was opened at Nagashima Island, neighboring Nagashima Aiseien Sanatorium
July 1941: National Leprosarium Oku-Kōmyō-En   
1946: National Sanatorium Oku-Kōmyō-En   
May 9, 1988: the Oku-Nagashima-Oohashi Bridge was completed from the mainland to the islands of Oku-Kōmyō-En and Nagashima Airakuen
April 1996: The 1953 Leprosy Prevention Law was abolished
July 1998: The trial for compensation started
May 11, 2001: The trial for compensation ruled that the previous Leprosy Prevention was unconstitutional
May 25, 2001: The trial for compensation was confirmed. The compensation of 8,000,000 yen to 14,000,000 yen was given to patients, depending on the duration of unconstitutional periods

Number of patients at end of fiscal year
The number of inpatients in a given year depends not only on those newly hospitalized and the recently deceased, but also on other factors such as patient escapes and discharges, depending on the conditions of the times. Recently, the sanatorium was encouraged to discharge patients , but a long-standing segregation and the resulting stigma against leprosy patients might have influenced the number of patients discharged.

See also
 Leprosy in Japan
 Takekichi Sugai, the first physician at Sotojima Sanatorium
 Torajiro Imada, the first director of Sotojima Sanatorium

References

Hospital buildings completed in 1909
Hospitals in Japan
Leper hospitals
Hospitals established in 1909
Leprosy in Japan
1909 establishments in Japan